Eugene Rodriguez (born June 4, 1929) is an American former lawyer and politician from New York.

Life
He was born on June 4, 1929, in East Harlem, New York City. He attended Straubenmuller Textile High School. He graduated from Long Island University and Brooklyn Law School. During the Korean War he served in the U.S. Army. He was admitted to the bar in 1955, and practiced law in New York City.

He was a member of the New York State Assembly (Bronx Co., 4th D.) in 1965. In September 1965, after re-apportionment, he ran in the 87th District for re-nomination, but was defeated in the Democratic primary by Salvatore R. Almeida.

In 1966, Rodriguez approached ex-convict Louis Fess Taylor to help him quash a narcotics indictment. Rodriguez asked for $100,000 and promised to fix the case. Taylor talked to the D.A.'s office about the offer, and at the next meetings carried a recording device. On July 27, Rodriguez was indicted for attempted extortion. On November 8, Rodriguez was elected to the New York State Senate (29th D.), but he did not take his seat in the 177th New York State Legislature. His trial opened on December 12. He asked his chauffeur Antonio Maldonado and one José Sierra to kill Taylor to prevent him from testifying at the trial. On January 13, 1967, Rodriguez was convicted of perjury and attempted grand larceny. On February 14, he was sentenced to one and a half to four years in jail, and thus vacated his Senate seat. On February 27, he pleaded guilty to have conspired to murder Taylor. On March 2, he was sentenced to one and a half to four years in jail for conspiracy to commit murder, to be served concurrently with the sentence for perjury. On April 4, 1967, he was disbarred by the Appellate Division. He was released from Clinton Correctional Facility on December 24, 1969.

On August 23, 1973, Rodriguez was arrested at his home in the East Village, Manhattan for illegal gambling.

References

1929 births
Living people
Democratic Party New York (state) state senators
Hispanic and Latino American state legislators in New York (state)
Democratic Party members of the New York State Assembly
Long Island University alumni
Brooklyn Law School alumni
Disbarred American lawyers
People from the East Village, Manhattan
People from East Harlem
Politicians from the Bronx